Stanislas Spero Adotevi (born 4 February 1934) is a Beninese politician, civil servant and UNICEF official. He served in Benin's government as Minister of Information in 1963 and as Minister of Culture between 1965 and 1968. He was later Director of the Institute of Applied Research and Director of the National Archives and Museums. In 1981 he was appointed as UNICEF Representative in the Republic of Upper Volta (Burkina Faso) and in 1987 he became the UNICEF Regional Director for West and Central Africa, directing UNICEF's work in 23 African countries. In 1995 he was appointed Special Advisor to UNICEF Executive Director Carol Bellamy.

References 

Government ministers of Benin
UNICEF people
1934 births
Living people
Place of birth missing (living people)
Beninese officials of the United Nations